The National Biscuit Company Building, located at 15 North Chenevert in Houston, Texas, was built for Nabisco in 1910, and listed on the National Register of Historic Places on February 20, 1998. The structure was converted to apartments and is now known as City View Lofts.

History
American snack company Nabisco was founded in 1898 and expanded rapidly during its early years. It built a new production facility in Houston, designed by in-house architect Albert G. Zimmerman. Nabisco operated within the facility until 1949, at which point it moved out and Purse & Co., a wholesale furniture distributor, took over the building.

In the 2000s, the building was redeveloped to include over 50 loft-style apartment units. It currently operates as City View Lofts.

See also
 National Register of Historic Places listings in Harris County, Texas
 National Biscuit Company Building (Des Moines, Iowa)

References

External links 

 City View Lofts web site

1910 establishments in Texas
Buildings and structures completed in 1910
Buildings and structures in Houston
Chicago school architecture in Texas
Industrial buildings and structures on the National Register of Historic Places in Texas
National Register of Historic Places in Houston
Nabisco